Alex Ivanov (born July 7, 1992) is an American soccer player who plays as a goalkeeper. He played college soccer for the Ohio State Buckeyes and also played in the NPSL with AFC Cleveland and Cleveland SC.

At the conclusion of the 2014 NCAA Division I men's soccer season, Ivanov won the men's soccer Senior CLASS Award, a national recognition for the most outstanding senior in college soccer.

Career

Youth and college
Ivanov was raised in Strongsville, Ohio where he played youth soccer for Cleveland United. Ahead of the 2010 college soccer season, Ivanov who had been attending Ohio State for college, was a walk-on for the men's soccer program, where he was immediately redshirted.

Towards the final stretch of his sophomore year, Ivanov began appearing in matches for the Buckeyes. During his redshirt junior year, Ivanov secured his starting role with Ohio State. Ivanov finished his junior year being named to the All-Big Ten second team. Ivanov also finished the season with 110 saves, which was fifth all time in program history. The 110 saves was also fifth in the nation during the season.

During the 2014 spring friendlies, Ivanov was named team co-captain. During his senior year, Ivanov was nominated for the Senior CLASS Award for men's soccer, winning the award.

Senior
Ivanov went undrafted in the 2015 MLS SuperDraft. Ahead of the 2015 NPSL season, he signed on with his hometown AFC Cleveland, in 2015 he appeared in all 13 matches for Cleveland, where they reached the regional semifinals of the 2015 NPSL Playoffs.

Personal life
Outside of soccer, Ivanov was a volunteer with the 2nd and 7 Foundation, the "Kids Kicking Cancer", and the "Friends of Jacly Foundation".

References

External links
 Ohio State profile
 

1992 births
Living people
American soccer players
Soccer players from Ohio
People from Strongsville, Ohio
Association football goalkeepers
Ohio State Buckeyes men's soccer players
Cleveland SC players
National Premier Soccer League players